Poonamallee is a state assembly constituency in Tiruvallur district in Tamil Nadu. Its State Assembly Constituency number is 5. The seat is reserved for candidates from the Scheduled Castes. It comprises portions of the Poonamallee and Thiruvallur taluks and is a part of the Thiruvallur constituency for national elections to the Parliament of India. It is one of the 234 State Legislative Assembly Constituencies in Tamil Nadu, in India.

Members of the Legislative Assembly

Elections and winners in the constituency are listed below:

Election results

2021

2019 By-election

2016

2011

2006

2001

1996

1991

1989

1984

1980

1977

References 

 

Assembly constituencies of Tamil Nadu
Tiruvallur district